The Koger Center for the Arts is an arts center located in Columbia, South Carolina, on the University of South Carolina campus.  It was built in 1988, and has 2,256 saleable seats.  The center is the home of the Columbia City Ballet, the South Carolina Philharmonic, and is also used for other functions such as The State of the State Address, The South Carolina Body Building Championships, The South Carolina Science Fair, Freshman Orientation, The Conductor's Institute, The Columbia Classical Ballet, and the dance concerts for the Columbia City Ballet, Southern Strutt's year-end concert and the university's doctoral hooding ceremonies.

The center is named for philanthropists Ira and Nancy Koger, who made a substantial donation for construction of the $15 million center. The descendants of Ambrose Elliott Gonzales, Narciso Gener Gonzales, and William Elliott Gonzales also made a large donation to the center and the Gonzales Hall auditorium was named in acknowledgement of their contribution.

The London Philharmonic Orchestra gave the first performance at the Koger Center on Saturday, January 14, 1989. James Taylor from Chapel Hill performed there in 1992 (he's performed there 3x). New Edition performed a benefit concert there on August 26, 2006, which was televised on BET. Ben Folds from Chapel Hill performed there in '06. Canadian Gordon Lightfoot performed there in '09. Comedian Daniel Tosh of Tosh.0 performed there in 2010, and reggae singer Matisyahu performed there in 2011. The Blue Man Group ('12), Art Garfunkel ('14), Weird Al Yankovic ('16), The Beach Boys ('17), 
Alice Cooper ('17), funk rock group The Time (band) with Sheila E. ('18), Joe Gatto of Impractical Jokers in '22, and Kevin James in '23. Riverdance, and Celtic Woman have performed at the Koger Center in recent years.

See also 
 List of concert halls

References

External links 
 Koger Center for the Arts website

Performing arts centers in South Carolina
Buildings and structures in Columbia, South Carolina
South Carolina culture
University of South Carolina
Tourist attractions in Columbia, South Carolina
University and college arts centers in the United States